This is a list of all the United States Supreme Court cases from volume 329 of the United States Reports:

External links

1947 in United States case law
1946 in United States case law